Oostkerke is a Belgian polder village and a borough of the West Flemish town of Damme. 

Location
The small village center is surrounded by old whitewashed houses. Nearby there is Oostkerke Castle and two windmills, and several canals are also nearby. In 1974 Oostkerke was voted the most beautiful village in West Flanders.

Church
Oostkerke is one of the oldest church communities of West Flanders, and for some time the communities of Damme, Moerkerke, Westkapelle and Lapscheure were within the Oostkerke parish.
According to legend, the Irish hermit and saint Guthagon died in or near Oostkerke.
He came to be considered a minor patron of that place.
After miracles occurred at his place of burial a chapel was erected.
The Bishop of Tournai placed the relics of his body in a shrine in 1159.
The church's graveyard may still have graves from the 14th and 15th centuries.
During the Reformation the saint's relics were scattered, and only one tooth survived.
The church was destroyed at the end of World War II, but was rebuilt to the original plan.

Notes

Sources

 

Damme
Populated places in West Flanders